Neal Martin Falls (September 24, 1969 – July 18, 2015) was an American suspected serial killer who was shot and killed in self-defense by Heather Saul, a sex worker in Charleston, West Virginia. Falls had been stopped by police in over twenty states during his life but did not incur any serious criminal charges. Only after his death did police discover evidence possibly tying Falls to other crimes.

Biography
Little is known about Neal Falls' early life. He was born on September 24, 1969, in Eugene, Oregon, into an impoverished family with nine other children. He spent his childhood and formative years living in various cities around Oregon. During his school years, he began to show an interest in firearms and subsequently became obsessed with military paraphernalia. After leaving high school, Falls was forced to engage in low-skilled labor. Despite this, he wasn't known to break the law, refrained from abusing alcohol or drugs, and was keen on collecting weapons and ammunition. Most of his friends and acquaintances spoke very positively of him.

In early 1992, Falls moved to Greensburg, Kansas, where he lived with his father until his death in 1995. He then returned to Oregon and found a job as a private security guard. After finishing his training, his fingerprints were entered in a national database in 1998. In 2000, Falls moved to Henderson, Nevada, where for the next eight years he worked as a security guard at Hoover Dam. During this period, he began to exhibit deviant behavior, including abusing animals in the desert regions of Arizona, over which he was subjected to disciplinary action. At the same time, Falls began to spend most of his leisure time in the company of various sex workers and pimps. In the mid-2000s, he visited the Philippines for the purpose of sex tourism.

In 2008, Falls was charged with sexually harassing a colleague, after which he was forced to quit. After this dismissal, he began to frequently change his place of residence; between 2009 and 2015, he lived in Oregon, Indiana, Kentucky, and Texas, where he was detained by police on several occasions for traffic violations.

In January 2015, Neal found out that a woman with whom he was intimately involved was married, after which, in the same month, his mother died. These two events greatly affected his emotional state, making him become internally conflicted and disorganized. In April 2015, Falls underwent retraining courses to continue working as a security guard in the private sector in Oregon, but by that summer he went to Texas, from where he moved to West Virginia.

Death and discovery
Shortly after moving to West Virginia, Falls met a sex worker named Heather Saul online and tracked down her address. After entering Saul's residence, he held her at gunpoint. Saul describes the struggle that ensued as follows: "When he strangled me, I grabbed my rake, and when he laid the gun down to get the rake out of my hands, I shot him ... I grabbed the gun and shot behind me." Falls died at the scene, shot by Saul in the head, killing him instantly.

Four sets of handcuffs were retrieved from Falls' body. When police officers searched the inside of his car, they allegedly found a machete, axes, knives, a shovel, a sledgehammer, bleach, plastic trash bags, bulletproof vests, clean white socks, and underwear.

Police linked the objects found, Falls' modus operandi and his previous known locations to the murders and disappearances of nine women in three states. During the eight years he lived in Henderson, Nevada, from 2003 to 2007, four sex workers disappeared, three of whom were later found dismembered in California, Illinois, and Nevada. All the missing women, like Saul, advertised their activities on the Internet. Six more vanished from Chillicothe, Ohio, a two-hour drive from Charleston. Despite the fact that no evidence was found of Falls' presence in Chillicothe, he is still considered a suspect. Since 1995, Falls had been detained by the police for violating traffic rules in sixteen states, and his true scale of movement and activity remains unknown. 

A list containing the names of six women involved in sex work and their contacts on social networks was found in Falls' pocket, which, according to the prosecutor's office, may have been intended victims. However, police investigations determined that all of them were alive and well; five of them were located across West Virginia and the sixth worked in San Diego. In 2018, Falls was tested for involvement in the I-70 Killer murders, a series of killings in the Midwestern United States in the spring of 1992. During that time he lived in Kansas, where one of the murders had occurred, and corresponded very closely to the suspect's image, but no physical evidence was located to corroborate these speculations.

Possible victims
Possible victims of Neal Falls include:
Jodi Brewer 
Lindsay Marie Harris
Misty Marie Saens
Tiffany Sayre
Shasta Himelrick
Charlotte Trego
Tameka Lynch
Wanda Lemons (missing)

Victims ruled out in Falls case
Timberly Claytor
Jessica Edith Foster (missing)
Loretta Joe Gates
Terri Lynn Bills
I-70 Killer victims

See also 
 List of serial killers in the United States

References

External links
 Neal Falls: Prostitute Serial Killer? at About.com

1969 births
2015 deaths
20th-century American criminals
21st-century American criminals
American male criminals
Crimes against sex workers in the United States
Criminals from Oregon
Deaths by firearm in West Virginia
People from Eugene, Oregon
Suspected serial killers